Loa Ho (28 May 1894 – 31 January 1943) was a Taiwanese poet who was born in Changhua County, Taiwan Prefecture, Fujian-Taiwan Province, Qing dynasty (modern-day Changhua, Taiwan). He was a medical doctor but had enormous fame in literature. His poetry works were especially praised, and Lai was commonly known as one of Taiwan's most representative poets. He is also hailed as the "Father of Modern Taiwanese Literature".

Early life
Loa's work can broadly be divided into three phases. During his early career, he wrote primarily classical Chinese poetry. On a sojourn as a doctor in a Japanese hospital in Amoy (now called Xiamen), a treaty port in China, he became acquainted with the work of Chinese May Fourth writers such as Lu Hsun. Although his stay in China seems to have been depressing, he returned to Taiwan with the intention to contribute to Taiwan's cultural scene. He opened a reading room in his clinic where he provided Chinese vernacular fiction and Japanese periodicals. This reading room allowed him to mentor several essential writers of the late Japanese colonial period. Most of his writing during this second period was nativist in his choice of themes and satirical in form. Through several short stories written during the 1920s and early 1930s, Loa satirized the brutality of colonial policemen, the indifference of the populace, and the impotence of native intellectuals. During the third period, Loa became more nativist in orientation and actively experimented with writing in Taiwanese. Although these experiments were not entirely successful, they expressed an emerging Taiwanese national consciousness upon which later Taiwanese writers would build.

Political activity and legacy
In addition to his writing, Loa participated in the Taiwanese Cultural Association and other activist groups. His political activity led to his arrest and a subsequent illness contracted in jail, which caused his early demise. Japanese wartime strictures on writing in languages other than the national language forced him to stop his literary output slightly before his death. He was an influence on his younger contemporaries Yang Kui and Wu Chuo-liu. His rediscovery during the late 1970s and early 1980s also contributed to Taiwan's new nativist literature.

Literature works
Source:

Fiction

 Also

Poetry
 Poems in: Taiwan Literature, English Translation Series 15 (2004): 165–76.

References

1894 births
1943 deaths
Male poets
20th-century Taiwanese poets
People from Changhua County
Taiwanese people of Hakka descent
Taiwanese prisoners and detainees
Taiwanese male short story writers
Prisoners and detainees of Japan
20th-century Taiwanese physicians